The Ministry of Trade and Industry is a cabinet level department in the government of Egypt. Its headquarters are located in Cairo. The position of minister has been held by Nevine Gamea since December 2019.

Former Ministers
Dr. Mustafa El-Rifai
Samir El-Sayiad
Hatem Saleh
Mounir Fakhry Abdel Nour
Tareq Qabil

See also

Cabinet of Egypt

References

External links
Ministry of Trade and Industry official website
Egypt's Cabinet Database

Egypt
Egypt
Industry